|}

The Chipchase Stakes is a Group 3 flat horse race in Great Britain open to horses aged three years or older. It is run at Newcastle over a distance of 6 furlongs (1,207 metres), and it is scheduled to take place each year in late June or early July.

The event was established in 1994 and is named after Chipchase Castle, a Jacobean mansion situated approximately 30 miles north west of Newcastle.  It was initially classed at Listed level before being promoted to Group 3 status in 2001. Since 2016 it has been run on a Tapeta all-weather track, having previously been contested on turf. It is one of four non-turf Group races in Britain, along with the Winter Derby, September Stakes and the Sirenia Stakes.

The Chipchase Stakes is run on the same afternoon as Newcastle's richest race, the Northumberland Plate.

Records
Most successful horse (2 wins):
 Tedburrow – 2000, 2002

Leading jockey (2 wins):
 Darryll Holland – Branston Abby (1995), Andreyev (1998)
 Kevin Darley – Halmahera (1999), Soldier's Tale (2005)
 Paul Hanagan – Utmost Respect (2008), Knot in Wood (2009)
 Graham Lee - Maarek (2012), Jack Dexter (2103)
 George Baker - Genki (2011), Aeolus (2015)

Leading trainer (2 wins):
 Mick Channon – Piccolo (1994), Royal Millennium (2004)
 Eric Alston – Tedburrow (2000, 2002)
 Richard Fahey – Utmost Respect (2008), Knot in Wood (2009)
 Jim Goldie - Orientor (2003), Jack Dexter (2013)

Winners

See also
 Horse racing in Great Britain
 List of British flat horse races

References
 Racing Post:

 galopp-sieger.de – Chipchase Stakes.
 ifhaonline.org – International Federation of Horseracing Authorities – Chipchase Stakes (2019).
 pedigreequery.com – Chipchase Stakes – Newcastle.

Flat races in Great Britain
Newcastle Racecourse
Open sprint category horse races
Recurring sporting events established in 1994
1994 establishments in England